Bluff Limbo is the second album of British IDM Producer μ-Ziq and the follow-up to Tango N' Vectif.

Reception

Bluff Limbo was placed at number 35 on the NME's list for best albums of 1994.

Track listing

Disc one

 "Hector's House"  – 4:26
 "Commemorative Pasta"  – 4:37
 "Gob Bots"  – 4:50
 "The Wheel"  – 6:15
 "27"  – 1:18
 "Metal Thing #3"  – 5:51
 "Twangle Frent"  – 7:06
 "Make It Funky"  – 4:38
 "Zombies"  – 5:17

Disc two

 "Riostand"  – 6:18
 "Organic Tomato Yoghurt"  – 3:58
 "Sick Porter"  – 5:15
 "Sick Porter"  – 7:38
 "Dance #2"  – 5:46
 "Nettle + Pralines"  – 6:29
 "Ethereal Murmurings"  – 10:20

Personnel 
 Mike Paradinas - Composer, producer

References

Mike Paradinas albums
1994 albums
Ambient techno albums
Experimental techno albums
Rephlex Records albums